is a railway station on the Kagoshima Main Line in Nishi-ku, Kumamoto, Japan. The station name means, literally, "in front of Sojo University".

Lines 

Layout 
The station consists of two side platforms serving two tracks at grade. There is no station building, only shelters on both platforms for waiting passengers and a small brickwork booth housing a ticket window. Access to the opposite side platform is by a footbridge.

Management of the station has been outsourced to the JR Kyushu Tetsudou Eigyou Co., a wholly owned subsidiary of JR Kyushu specialising in station services. It staffs the ticket counter which is equipped with a POS machine but does not have a Midori no Madoguchi facility.

Adjacent stations

History
JR Kyushu opened the station on 13 March 1988 as an additional station on the existing track of the Kagoshima Main Line. At that time, the station was named , literally "in front of Kumamoto Industrial University", after the institute of higher education nearby. Four years later, the station followed suit, becoming Sōjōdaigakumae on 13 March 2004. With the privatization of JNR on 1 April 1987, JR Kyushu took over control of the station.

Passenger statistics
In fiscal 2016, the station was used by an average of 1,475 passengers daily (boarding passengers only), and it ranked 119th among the busiest stations of JR Kyushu.

References

External links
Sōjōdaigakumae (JR Kyushu)

Railway stations in Kumamoto Prefecture
Railway stations in Japan opened in 1988